, or MBS, is a radio and television broadcasting company headquartered in Osaka, Japan, affiliated with Japan Radio Network (JRN), National Radio Network (NRN), Japan News Network (JNN) and TBS Network, serving in the Kansai region.

It is a parent company of a television station named  and a radio station named . MBS is also one of the major stockholders of TBS Holdings, BS-TBS, RKB Mainichi Broadcasting, i-Television, TV-U Fukushima, Hiroshima Home Television, WOWOW., and FM802.

History
The  was founded on December 27, 1950.
NJB commenced radio broadcasting from the Hankyu Department Store on September 1, 1951, as the second commercial radio station in Japan.
NJB founded  on December 1, 1956 with Asahi Broadcasting Corporation (ABC).
NJB was renamed "Mainichi Broadcasting System, Inc." on June 1, 1958.
On March 1, 1959, after selling all stocks of OTV to ABC, MBS started analog terrestrial television broadcasting independently from OTV, and made a network with Nippon Educational Television Co., Ltd. (NET, the predecessor of TV Asahi Corporation).
In 1960 a broadcasting studio was completed in Senri.

In 1964 MBS formed a radio network with TBS Radio and RKB Radio, which evolved into Japan Radio Network (JRN) in 1965.
in 1974 MBS joined the All-Nippon News Network (ANN).
However, MBS joined the Japan News Network (JNN) on March 31, 1975 due to then-president of the Asahi Shimbun's order to the ABC to switch its flagship station to NET.
On May 15, 1977, the frequency of MBS Radio changed from 1210 kHz to 1180 kHz.

The American Broadcasting Company (ABC, not to be confused with the Asahi Broadcasting Corporation) acquired a 5% stake on New Japan Broadcasting in 1951 and remained as a shareholder in MBS through the 1970s; ABC retained 5% of all shares in 1977, making it the third largest shareholder at the time.

On November 23, 1978 at 5:00am MBS Radio's frequency was moved again from 1180 kHz to 1179 kHz.
In 1990 the new headquarters and studios was completed in Chayamachi, Kita Ward, Osaka for the station's 40th anniversary. MBS moved and merged the headquarters and studio on September 1; the registered headquarters from the Mainichi Shimbun Osaka Head Office, and the broadcasting studio from Senri.

MBS Now aired for the last time on September 29, 2000. It was replaced by Voice on October 2.
On March 31, 2001 a broadcasting studio called "MBS Studio in USJ" was opened at Universal Studios Japan.
December 1, 2003 at 11 a.m. MBS commenced digital terrestrial television operations.
On May 15, 2010 MBS began to simulcast its radio broadcasts online within the Kansai region via Radiko together with ABC, OBC, FM 802, FM Osaka, and FM Cocolo.

The construction of the new building that was started in March 2011, located north of its head office, completed on September 4, 2013 named "B Building". The headquarters building was named "M Building".
On July 24, 2011, at noon, MBS, along with other television stations in the Kansai region, turned off its analog broadcast, as part of the digital television transition in most prefectures of Japan.
On October 1, 2013 the Takaishi Solar Plant was situated in the area of MBS Takaishi Radio Transmitter. 
On April 4, 2014, the B Building was opened.

Offices and studios
Headquarters (M Building) and Studio (B Building) - 17–1, Chayamachi, Kita-ku, Osaka-shi
Tokyo Branch - Akasaka Biz Tower (28th floor), 3–1, Akasaka Gochome, Minato-ku, Tokyo-to
Nagoya Branch - Nagoya Yusen Building (8th floor), 6-35, Nishiki Sanchome, Naka-ku, Nagoya-shi
Kyoto Branch - Urbanex Oike Building (West Wing), 358 Umeyacho, Nakagyo-ku, Kyoto-shi
Kobe Branch - Imon Kobe Building (13th floor), 95 Edomachi, Chuō-ku, Kobe-shi
Tokushima Branch - Nippon Life Tokushima Building (6th floor), 11 Yaoyamachi Nichome, Tokushima-shi, Tokushima-ken
Shanghai Branch

Broadcasting

Radio

JOOR
Frequency: 1210 kHz → 1180 kHz → 1179 kHz; 90.6 MHz FM
Power
Osaka:50 kW
Kyoto:300 W
Total:50.3 kW (or Kyoto station use 10 kW in Day and 50.5 kW in Night)
Broadcasting hours: from 4:30 on Mondays until 26:30 on Sundays (with daily starting at 4:00 from Tuesday until Sunday)
Time signal: 1046.502 Hz (C6, on the hour every hour)

TV

JOOR-TV (analog)
Mt. Ikoma: Channel 4

JOOY-DTV (digital)
Mt. Ikoma: Channel 16 (Remote controller button: 4)

Branch stations of TV broadcasting
Osaka Prefecture
Kashiwara (analog): Channel 54
Kashiwara (digital): Channel 16
Misaki-Fuke (analog): Channel 54
Misaki-Fuke (digital): Channel 16
Naka-Nose (digital): Channel 16
Nishi-Nose (digital): Channel 16
Nara Prefecture
Ikoma-Asukano (analog): Channel 37
Tochihara (analog): Channel 33
Tochihara (digital): Channel 39
Yoshino (analog): Channel 34
Shiga Prefecture
Otsu (analog): Channel 36
Otsu (digital): Channel 16
Otsu-Ishiyama (analog): Channel 18
Otsu-Ishiyama (digital): Channel 44
Hikone (analog): Channel 54
Hikone (digital): Channel 16
Koka (analog): Channel 55
Koka (digital): Channel 16
Kyoto Prefecture
Yamashina, Kyoto (analog): Channel 54
Yamashina, Kyoto (digital): Channel 39
Kameoka (analog): Channel 33
Kameoka (digital): Channel 16
Fukuchiyama (analog): Channel 54
Fukuchiyama (digital): Channel 16
Maizuru (analog): Channel 53
Maizuru (digital): Channel 16
Miyazu (analog): Channel 33
Miyazu (digital): Channel 16
Mineyama (analog): Channel 34
Mineyama (digital): Channel 16
Hyogo Prefecture
Kobe (mountain area) (analog): Channel 31
Kobe (mountain area) (digital): Channel 16
Nada, Kobe (analog): Channel 54
Hokutan-Tarumi (analog): Channel 53
Hokutan-Tarumi (digital): Channel 16
Nishinomiya-Yamaguchi (analog): Channel 55
Nishinomiya-Yamaguchi (digital): Channel 16
Inagawa (analog): Channel 35
Inagawa (digital): Channel 38
Tatsuno (analog): Channel 34
Tatsuno (digital): Channel 16
Miki (analog): Channel 34
Miki (digital): Channel 16
Himeji (analog): Channel 54
Himeji (digital): Channel 16
Himeji-nishi (analog): Channel 33
Himeji (digital): Channel 16
Ako (analog): Channel 54
Ako (digital): Channel 16
Wadayama (analog): Channel 54
Wadayama (digital): Channel 16
Kinosaki (analog): Channel 54
Kinosaki (digital): Channel 16
Kasumi (analog): Channel 33
Kasumi (digital): Channel 16
Sasayama (analog): Channel 33
Sasayama (digital): Channel 16
Hikami (analog): Channel 33
Kasumi (digital): Channel 16
Aioi (analog): Channel 33
Aioi (digital): Channel 16
Yamasaki (analog): Channel 33
Yamasaki (digital): Channel 21
Fukusaki (analog): Channel 33
Fukusaki (digital): Channel 16
Sayo (analog): Channel 33
Yoka (analog): Channel 34
Yoka (digital): Channel 16

Wakayama Prefecture
Wakayama (analog): Channel 42
Wakayama (digital): Channel 16
Kainan (analog): Channel 54
Kainan (digital): Channel 16
Hashimoto (analog): Channel 54
Hashimoto (digital): Channel 42
Gobo (analog): Channel 53
Gobo (digital): Channel 47
Kibi (analog): Channel 54
Kibi (digital): Channel 47
Tanabe (analog): Channel 54
Tanabe (digital): Channel 47
Arida (analog): Channel 35
Arida (digital): Channel 16
Shingu (analog): Channel 36

Special events
MBS Radio Walk (MBSラジオウォーク)
MBS Radio Festival (MBSラジオまつり)

Announcers

Present
Head of Announcers

Male

Female

Past

Male

, etc.

Female

, etc.

References

External links
MBS Official Site
MBS Official Site 
MBS Radio 

1951 establishments in Japan
Anime companies
Companies based in Osaka Prefecture
Japan News Network
 
Mass media in Osaka
Radio in Japan
Radio stations established in 1951
Television channels and stations established in 1959
Television stations in Japan